uBlock Origin ("" ) is a free and open-source browser extension for content filtering, including ad blocking. The extension is available for Chrome, Chromium, Edge, Firefox, Opera, Pale Moon, as well as versions of Safari prior to 13. uBlock Origin has received praise from technology websites and is reported to be much less memory-intensive than other extensions with similar functionality. uBlock Origin's stated purpose is to give users the means to enforce their own (content-filtering) choices.

uBlock Origin is actively developed and maintained by its creator and lead developer Raymond Hill.

History

uBlock
uBlock was initially named "μBlock" but the name was later changed to "uBlock" to avoid confusion as to how the Greek letter μ (Mu/Micro) in "μBlock" should be pronounced. Development started by forking from the codebase of HTTP Switchboard along with another blocking extension called uMatrix, designed for advanced users. uBlock was developed by Raymond Hill to use community-maintained block lists, while adding features and raising the code quality to release standards. First released in June 2014 as a Chrome and Opera extension, by winter 2015, the extension had expanded to other browsers.

The uBlock project official repository was transferred to Chris Aljoudi by original developer Raymond Hill in April 2015, due to frustration of dealing with requests. However, Hill immediately self-forked it and continued the effort there. This version was later renamed uBlock Origin and it has been completely divorced from Aljoudi's uBlock. Aljoudi created ublock.org to host and promote uBlock and to request donations. In response, uBlock's founder Raymond Hill stated that "the donations sought by ublock.org are not benefiting any of those who contributed most to create uBlock Origin." The development of uBlock stopped in August 2015 and it has been sporadically updated since January 2017. In July 2018, ublock.org was acquired by AdBlock, and since February 2019, uBlock began allowing "Acceptable Ads", a program run by Adblock Plus that allows some ads which are deemed "acceptable", and for which the larger publishers pay a fee.

uBlock Origin remains independent and does not allow ads for payment.

uBlock Origin
Raymond Hill, the founder and original author of uBlock, continued to work on the extension under the name uBlock Origin, sometimes stylized as uBlock0, and abbreviated as uBO.

A joint Sourcepoint and comScore survey reported an 833% growth rate over a ten-month tracking period ending in August 2015, the strongest growth among software listed. The report attributed the growth to the desire of users for pure blockers outside the "acceptable advertising" program.

In January 2016, uBlock Origin was added to the repositories for Debian 9 and Ubuntu 16.04. The extension was awarded "Pick of the Month" by Mozilla for May 2016.

On December 11, 2016, Nik Rolls released a fork of uBlock Origin for the Microsoft Edge browser (now known as Microsoft Edge Legacy). In April 2020, this fork was deprecated as Microsoft replaced Microsoft Edge Legacy with a Chromium-based Edge.

, the uBlock Origin Chrome extension had over 10 million active users and the Firefox version had 5 million active users.

The project specifically refuses donations and instead advises supporters to donate to maintainers of block lists.

Features

Blocking and filtering
uBlock Origin supports the majority of Adblock Plus's filter syntax. The popular filter lists EasyList and EasyPrivacy are enabled by default, along with the malware domain blocklist URLHaus. The extensions are capable of importing hosts files and a number of community-maintained lists are available at installation. Among the host files available, Peter Lowe's ad servers & tracking list and lists of malware domains are also enabled as default. Some additional features include dynamic filtering of scripts and iframes and a tool for webpage element hiding.

uBlock Origin includes a growing list of features not available in uBlock, including:
 A mode to assist those with color vision deficiency.
 A dynamic URL filtering feature.
 Logging functionality.
 Interface enhancements including a DOM inspector, privacy-oriented options to block link prefetching, hyperlink auditing, and IP address leaks via WebRTC (uBO-Extra is required to block WebRTC connections in Chromium).

Site-specific switches to toggle the blocking of pop-ups, strict domain blocking, cosmetic filtering, blocking remote fonts, and JavaScript disabling were also added to uBlock Origin. The Firefox version of uBlock Origin has an extra feature which helps to foil attempts by web sites to circumvent blockers.

CNAME-uncloaking third-party trackers in Firefox
In November 2019, a uBlock Origin user reported a novel technique used by some sites to bypass third-party tracker blocking. These sites link to URLs that are sub-domains of the page's domain, but those sub-domains resolve to third-party hosts via a CNAME record. Since the initial URL contained a sub-domain of the current page, it was interpreted by browsers as a first-party request and so was allowed by the filtering rules in uBlock Origin (and in similar extensions). The uBlock Origin developer came up with a solution using a DNS API which is exclusive to Firefox 60+. The new feature was implemented in uBlock Origin 1.25, released on February 19, 2020.

Performance
Technology websites and user reviews for uBlock Origin have regarded the extension as less resource-intensive than extensions that provide similar feature sets such as Adblock Plus. A benchmark test, conducted in August 2015 with ten blocking extensions, showed uBlock Origin as the most resource-efficient among the extensions tested.

uBlock Origin surveys what style resources are required for an individual web page rather than relying on a universal style sheet. The extension takes a snapshot of the filters the user has enabled, which contributes to accelerated browser start-up speed when compared to retrieving filters from cache every time.

Supported platforms
uBlock Origin is actively developed for applications based on two major layout engines.

Currently supported
 Blink
 Google Chrome/Chromium (desktop)
 Opera (desktop)
 Microsoft Edge (Chromium) (desktop)
 Gecko
 Firefox (desktop: 0.85.5 and later)
 Firefox for Android (mobile: 0.9.1.0 and later)
 Thunderbird (desktop: 1.3.0 and later)
 SeaMonkey

Previously supported
 WebKit
 Safari (desktop: uBlock Origin 1.10.0 and later (Beta)). Stopped working with macOS 10.15 Catalina and Safari 13.
 EdgeHTML
 Microsoft Edge (legacy) (uBlock Origin is available on the Windows Store in beta from 1.10.0).

See also

 Ghostery
 NoScript
 Privacy Badger

Explanatory notes

References

External links
 
 

2014 software
Ad blocking software
Advertising-free media
Computer-related introductions in 2014
Free Firefox WebExtensions
Firewall software
Free security software
Google Chrome extensions
Internet privacy software
Online advertising
Software using the GPL license